Piz Suvretta is a mountain of the Albula Alps, located west of St. Moritz in the canton of Graubünden. It lies south of Piz Bever, on the range surrounding the Val Bever.

References

External links
 Piz Suvretta on Hikr

Mountains of the Alps
Mountains of Graubünden
Mountains of Switzerland
Alpine three-thousanders